Jane Haycock Woods (October 10, 1946 – July 18, 2022) was an American educator and Republican politician who served as a member of the Virginia Senate from 1992 to 2000, and Virginia House of Delegates from 1988 to 1992.

Biography
She was for many years an elementary teacher with Fairfax County Public Schools.

In 1999, Woods lost her Senate reelection bid against former U.S. Representative Leslie L. Byrne. In 2002, she was appointed Virginia Secretary of Health and Human Resources by Democratic Governor Mark Warner, serving in that role until 2006.

References

External links
 

1946 births
2022 deaths
People from Bethesda, Maryland
State cabinet secretaries of Virginia
American University alumni
Republican Party members of the Virginia House of Delegates
Republican Party Virginia state senators
Schoolteachers from Virginia
20th-century American women educators
20th-century American politicians
20th-century American women politicians
21st-century American politicians
21st-century American women politicians
20th-century American educators
Women state legislators in Virginia